Bisis is a Sepik language spoken in East Sepik Province, Papua-New Guinea. It is spoken in three villages, including Yembiyembi of Gawi Rural LLG in East Sepik Province.

References

Bahinemo languages
Languages of East Sepik Province